Orania mixta is a species of sea snail, a marine gastropod mollusk in the family Muricidae, the murex snails or rock snails.

Description

Distribution
This marine species occurs off the Philippines.

References

 Liu, J.Y. [Ruiyu] (ed.). (2008). Checklist of marine biota of China seas. China Science Press. 1267 pp.
 [https://www.biodiversitylibrary.org/page/59176576

External links
 Houart R. (1995["1994"]) The Ergalataxinae (Gastropoda, Muricidae) from the New Caledonia region with some comments on the subfamily and the description of thirteen new species from the Indo-West Pacific. Bulletin du Muséum National d'Histoire Naturelle, Paris, ser. 4, 16(A, 2-4): 245–297]

Gastropods described in 1995
Orania (gastropod)